Melanosphecia is a genus of moths in the family Sesiidae.

Species
Melanosphecia atra Le Cerf, 1916
Melanosphecia auricollis (Rothschild, 1912)
Melanosphecia dohertyi Hampson, 1919
Melanosphecia funebris (Rothschild, 1911)

References

Sesiidae